Alexander Baumann (born 28 May 1984 in Rastatt, West Germany) is a curler from Baden-Baden, Germany.

Baumann qualified for his first World Championship in 2016 in Basel, Switzerland. They finished 1-10.
He also qualified For the 2017 Ford World Men's Curling Championship in Edmonton, Alberta, where they finished 3-8  He skipped the Germans again at the 2018 World Men's Curling Championship, finishing in last place with a 1-11 record.

At the international level, he is a 2011 European Mixed Championship silver medallist and a  bronze medallist.

At the national level, he is a two time German men's champion curler (2015, 2016) and two time bronze medallist (2013, 2014).

Teams

Men's

Mixed

Personal life
Baumann is a soldier, and he is single.

References

External links 
 

1984 births
Living people
German male curlers
German curling champions
People from Rastatt
People from Baden-Baden
Sportspeople from Karlsruhe (region)
21st-century German people